Maleka Begum (born 1944) is a Bangladeshi feminist, author, academic.

Biography
Begum was born in 1944. Her father's name is Abdul Aziz and mother is Fahima Begum.

Maleka Begum completed her secondary education from Nari Shikkha Mandir Girls' High School (Sher-E-Bangla Girls' High School). She earned her B.A. and M.A. from University of Dhaka in Bengali literature and Sociology in 1965 and 1966 and in 1968 (Sociology).

Begum teaches at Central Women's University and visiting faculty of Department of Women and Gender Studies at University of Dhaka.

Begum is one of the founding general secretaries of Bangladesh Mahila Parishad.

Writings
Maleka Begum has written over 30 books on women and gender issues. Some of the books are:
 ইলা মিত্র (Ela Mitra)
 নারী আন্দোলনের পাঁচ দশক (Five decades of women movement)
 মুক্তিযুদ্ধে নারী (Women in Liberation War)
 রমণীয় নয় (Not like Women)
 শুভ্র সমুজ্জ্বল (Suvra Sommujal)
 সংরক্ষিত মহিলা আসন সরাসরি নির্বাচন (Reserve Women Seat: Direct Election)
 সূর্যসেনের স্ত্রী পুষ্পকুন্তলা ও চট্টগ্রামের বিপ্লবী নারীদের কথা (Wife of Surya Sen, Puspakuntala and Revolutionary Women in Chittagong)
 বিপন্ন নারী (Endangered Women)
 যৌতুকের সংস্কৃতি (Culture of Dowry)

Awards
Begum won Anannya Literature Award in 1418 BS (2012 CE).

References

External links
 Book review on Daily Star on June 22, 2015.

1944 births
Living people
Bangladeshi women academics
University of Dhaka alumni
Academic staff of the University of Dhaka